Glenn Fleshler  is an American actor. On television he is noted as a recurring cast member on Boardwalk Empire who portrayed real-life bootlegger George Remus, for appearing on Billions, and as Errol Childress in the first season of the crime drama True Detective. He had a supporting role in the 2019 film Joker.

Early life and education
Fleshler was born to a Jewish family and studied acting at New York University's Tisch School of the Performing Arts, from which he has an MFA.

Career

Film
Fleshler's first major film was 1998's A Price Above Rubies. More recently, he has appeared in such films as Blue Jasmine, A Most Violent Year, God's Pocket, and The Rendezvous.

Television
Fleshler's television credits include Billions, Barry, Sex and the City, Law & Order, Law & Order: Special Victims Unit, Fringe, Third Watch, Bored to Death, The Good Wife, FBI Most Wanted, The Following. He portrayed George Remus in seasons 2–4 of Boardwalk Empire, and Errol Childress in Season 1 of True Detective. He played Dr. Cordell Doemling, Mason Verger's physician and henchman, in season 3 of Hannibal. He played Judge Roth in the miniseries The Night Of. He was also cast as Officer Christopher Lasky in episode 3 of the 2019 revival of The Twilight Zone.

Theater
Fleshler's Broadway credits include Death of a Salesman, Guys and Dolls, Arcadia, and The Merchant of Venice. Off-Broadway, he has appeared in such plays as Measure for Measure and Pericles, Prince of Tyre.

Filmography

Film

Television

Video games

References

External links

Lynch, Tess. "Who’s That Guy? Glenn Fleshler, a.k.a. Errol Childress of ‘True Detective’!" Hollywood Prospectus. March 11, 2014.

Living people
20th-century American male actors
21st-century American male actors
American male film actors
American male stage actors
American male television actors
American male voice actors
Jewish American male actors
Tisch School of the Arts alumni
Place of birth missing (living people)
Year of birth missing (living people)